Galkin Nunatak is an isolated nunatak about  northwest of Mount Coman, surmounting the interior ice plateau near the base of Palmer Land, Antarctica. It was mapped by the United States Geological Survey from ground surveys and U.S. Navy air photos, 1961–67, and was named by the Advisory Committee on Antarctic Names for William L. Galkin, a meteorologist at Byrd Station, summer 1965–66.

References

Nunataks of Palmer Land